The Church of Ceylon is the Anglican Church in Sri Lanka. It is an extra-provincial jurisdiction of the Archbishop of Canterbury, who serves as its Metropolitan. It was established in 1845 with the appointment of the first Anglican Bishop of Colombo, James Chapman and until 1950 it consisted of a single diocese; in that year a second diocese was established at Kurunegala.

Dioceses of Colombo and Kurunegala 
The first services were held on the island in 1796 and missionaries were sent to Ceylon to begin work in 1818. The Church now has two dioceses, one in Colombo (covering the Western, Southern, Eastern, Northern and Uva provinces and Ratnapura, Nuwara Eliya and Puttalam districts) and the other in Kurunegala (covering Kurunegala, Kandy, Matale and Kegalla, Anuradapura, Polonnaruwa, districts). The Diocese of Colombo was founded in 1845 and the Diocese of Kurunegala in 1950.

The Bishop of Calcutta was the Metropolitan Bishop of India and Ceylon from 10 October 1835. In 1930 Ceylon was included in the Church of India, Burma, and Ceylon (from 1948 the Church of India, Pakistan, Burma, and Ceylon) until 1970. In 1970, the Church of the Province of Myanmar, the Church of Ceylon, and the Church of Pakistan were separated from the CIBC (and the province of Calcutta).

There has been a movement for the amalgamation of traditional Protestant Churches (including Church of Ceylon, Methodist Church, Lanka Baptist Sangamaya, Salvation Army, Presbyterian Church of Sri Lanka and the Christian Reformed Church of Sri Lanka (formerly the Dutch Reformed Church) and the Jaffna Diocese of the Church of South India into one body, namely the Church of Sri Lanka. 

The Anglican Bishop of Colombo, Dushantha Lakshman Rodrigo has four archdeaconries, namely, Colombo, Galle, Jaffna and Upcountry and East. Keerthisiri Fernando the 6th Bishop of Kurunegala has one archdeaconry.

The Church of Ceylon with around 50,000 members, is the second largest group of Christians in Sri Lanka, after the Roman Catholic Church with 1,600,000 members.

Church and education 
The missionaries of the Church Missionary Society established many schools in all parts of the island. The missionaries who arrived in Galle started to establish schools in order to uplift the education of the natives and to spread the Christian religion. Robert Mayor who arrived on 29 June 1818 was the 1st missionary to establish a school in the "Church Hill", Baddegama under the name of "Christ Church" adjoining the Baddegama seminary. 

During the early years, the Society for the Propagation of the Gospel (SPG), the ‘high church’ missionary society, assisted the early bishops of the Diocese of Colombo (Anglican) to set up schools. The SPG helped Bishop James Chapman establish the College of Saint Thomas the Apostle in Mutwal, which opened on 3 February 1851. Later the College was shifted to Mt. Lavinia. The SPG continued to support the College until they withdrew from Ceylon in 1930. 

By the year 1910 the Anglican church had 403 schools with a student population of 32, 783. A teacher training college was established in 1914 in Peradeniya by Alexander G. Fraser, principal of Trinity College, Kandy.  The Anglican schools in Sri Lanka are famous for providing quality education enriched with Christian values giving priority to discipline. The schools provide education in English, Sinhala and Tamil languages giving prominence to the English Language. 

The schools are independently and privately managed by the CMS governing body headed by the bishops of the church, while some schools like Trinity College Kandy have adopted a board of governors under the patronage of the Bishop of Kurunegala. 

From the past Anglican schools have produced many notable personalities. Prime ministers D. S. Senanayake, Dudley Senanayake, Wijayananda Dahanayake and S. W. R. D. Bandaranaike were past pupils of S. Thomas' College, Mount Lavinia as well as Leslie Goonewardene and N. M. Perera, founders of Ceylon's first political party.

Leading Anglican schools in Sri Lanka

 S. Thomas' College, Mount Lavinia
 Trinity College, Kandy
 Hillwood College 
 Ladies' College, Colombo 
 Bishop's College, Colombo 
 CMS Mowbray College, Kandy
 S. Thomas' Preparatory School 
 S. Thomas' College, Gurutalawa 
 S. Thomas' College, Bandarawela 
 St. John's College, Jaffna 
 Chundikuli Girls' College 
 St. Paul's Girls School, Milagiriya 
 St. Thomas' College, Matara 
 Christ Church College, Matale 
 All Saints College, Galle 
 St. John's College, Nugegoda 
 St. John's College, Panadura 
 Christ Church Boys' College, Baddegama
 Christ Church Girls' College, Baddegama
 Bishop Lakdasa De Mel College, Kurunegala
 St Andrew's Girls College, Nawalapitiya
 Holy Trinity College, Nuwara Eliya

Hymn for Ceylon 
In the early 20th century an Anglican missionary, W. S. Senior popularly known as the Bard of Lanka arrived in Ceylon to work with the Church Missionary Society. He was Vice-Principal of Trinity College, Kandy for many years and spent three decades in the country. W. S. Senior wrote the 'Hymn for Ceylon,' sung to this day in churches on the island. The music for parts of this hymn was composed in 1950 by the leading Sri Lankan folk musician Deva Suriya Sena.

See also 
Christianity in Sri Lanka
Anglican Bishop of Colombo
Bishop of Kurunegala
Cathedral of Christ the Living Saviour
Cathedral of Christ the King, Kurunegala
St. Paul's Church, Kandy
Trinity College Chapel, Kandy
Church of Ceylon church buildings in Sri Lanka
Theological College of Lanka

References

External links 
Diocese of Colombo
The Church of Ceylon (Anglican Communion)
Anglican Church of Ceylon News
Worship Resources including a Prayer for Sri Lanka written by Metropolitan Lakdasa de Mel
The Church of Ceylon – World Council of Churches website
A photo selection of Parishes of the Church of Ceylon

Hymn
A Sinhalese Hymn filmed at Holy Emmanuel Church, Moratuwa – Anglican Church of Ceylon on YouTube
The Hymn for Ceylon – Trilingual (Anglican Communion)

Publications
One hundred years in Ceylon, or, The centenary volume of the Church Missionary Society in Ceylon, 1818–1918 (1922) Author: Balding, John William Madras: Printed at the Diocesan Press.
The Church of Ceylon – her faith and mission Published in 1945, Printed at the Daily News Press by Bernard de Silva for the Church of Ceylon.
The Church of Ceylon: A history, 1945–1995  Editor:   	 Medis, Frederick Published for the Diocese of Colombo.

 
Religious organizations established in 1845
Christian denominations established in the 19th century
1845 establishments in Ceylon
Extra-provincial Anglican churches